The National Board of Review Award for Best Actress is one of the annual film awards given (since 1945) by the National Board of Review of Motion Pictures.

Winners

1940s

1950s

1960s

1970s

1980s

1990s

2000s

2010s

2020s

Multiple awards

3 wins
 Emma Thompson (1992, 1995, 2013)
 Liv Ullmann (1968, 1973, 1976)

2 wins
 Anne Bancroft (1962, 1977)
 Ingrid Bergman (1958, 1978)
 Julie Christie (1965, 2007)
 Jodie Foster (1988, 1991)
 Holly Hunter (1987, 1993)
 Glenda Jackson (1970, 1981)
 Anna Magnani (1946, 1955)
 Julianne Moore (2002, 2014)
 Carey Mulligan (2009, 2020)
 Geraldine Page (1961, 1969)
 Meryl Streep (1982, 2017)

See also
 New York Film Critics Circle Award for Best Actress
 National Society of Film Critics Award for Best Actress
 Los Angeles Film Critics Association Award for Best Actress

References

National Board of Review Awards
Film awards for lead actress
Awards established in 1945
1945 establishments in the United States